Phyllonorycter alaskana is a moth of the family Gracillariidae. It is known from Alaska in the United States, and Saskatchewan, Quebec, and Newfoundland in Canada.

The larvae feed on Alnus crispa sinuata and Alnus viridis sinuata. They mine the leaves of their host plant. The mine is found on the underside of the leaf.

References

alaskana
Moths of North America

Moths described in 1982
Leaf miners
Lepidoptera of the United States
Lepidoptera of Canada
Taxa named by Gerfried Deschka